The 2017 Conference USA Championship Game was played on Saturday, December 2, 2017, at FAU Stadium in Boca Raton, Florida, and determined the 2017 football champion of Conference USA (C-USA). The game was played between Florida Atlantic, the East Division champion, and North Texas, the West Division champion. The title sponsor was Dynacraft BSC.

In the 2016 championship game, hosted by WKU, the Hilltoppers had defeated Louisiana Tech 58–44. The 2017 championship game was the 13th game in the championship series and was won by Florida Atlantic, 41–17.

Teams

North Texas Mean Green

North Texas claimed its place in the title game on November 11 with a 45–10 win over UTEP.

Florida Atlantic Owls

Florida Atlantic clinched the East division on November 18 after defeating rivals FIU 52-24 in the Shula Bowl. The win also ensured that the Owls would host the championship game. At the time, FAU was 7–0 in C-USA play to North Texas' 6–1, with each team having one conference game to play. Although an FAU loss and North Texas win would have left the teams tied, the Owls held the tiebreaker with a head-to-head win over the Mean Green during the season.

Aftermath
North Texas went on to play in the 2017 New Orleans Bowl, losing to Troy. Florida Atlantic went on to play in the 2017 Boca Raton Bowl, defeating Akron.

If the winner of the C-USA Championship Game was one of the highest in the rankings of the "Group of Five" conferences, the team could have been placed in the College Football Playoff or a "New Year's Six" bowl. Otherwise, the conference champion would supposedly choose which game to attend, from those with ties to the conference. However, FAU athletic director Pat Chun said that FAU did not choose the Boca Raton Bowl, but that FAU was told where to go by the conference.

Game summary

Scoring summary

Source:

Statistics

References

Championship
Conference USA Football Championship Game
Florida Atlantic Owls football games
North Texas Mean Green football games
Conference USA Football Championship Game
Conference USA